Hans Sebastian Pasquale Fronda (born November 3, 1981, Hökåsen, Västerås) is a Swedish hip-hop artist. He released his first studio album in 2004, and toured Sweden in summer 2006. He then took a time-out from doing live performances to work on his next album, Fridlysta Frekvenser. The first single from that album was released on April 11, 2007. He made his stage comeback on the televised radio-show Radiogalan on April 29, 2007, along with Markoolio, Emilia Rydberg, and Sunrise Avenue.

Jonas Stentäpp of Dala-Demokraten has described Fronda as "one of the most entertaining hip-hop artists" in Sweden for his "heavy beats, unusually interesting choruses, and good flow in the lyrics." Fronda participated in the 2008 Melodifestivalen with the song "Ingen mår så bra som jag", saying that his participation in the contest was "a step in the right direction for me both as a human and as an artist. [Being in Melodifestivalen is] the biggest thing you can experience as an artist in Sweden." The song reached eleventh place on the Swedish Singles Chart in March 2008. Fronda was originally going to compete with another song in the 2007 Melodifestivalen, but was disqualified when he refused to sing the song by himself. He also participated in the 2004 Swedish celebrity version of Fort Boyard.

Discography

Solo Albums/demo 
 Fortfarande Underjord (2003) Fronda's first solo demo
 En armé på två ben (2004) Fronda's official album
 Då Fronda Fortfarande Var Underjord (2004) Remaster of the solo demo
 Livet Genom En Pansarvagnspipa (2005) features artists such as Stephen Simmonds, Kamphundar, Leafy, Olle Ljungström and Papa Dee
 Etiketten Är Musik (2006) features Madchild and Matth
 Fridlysta Frekvenser (2007) released under 'Bonnier Music' on 19 September 2007
 Generation Robot (2008) released for free on 10 December 2008
 Hypernova (2010) a compilation album of unreleased songs
 Svart Poesi (2010) sold and released digitally since 14 December 2010
 Tuggummi (2013)
 Väderkvarnsjättar (2014) sold and released digitally since Mars 2014
 Vintervägen (2015) 
 Den ofärdiga svanen (2016) 
 811103 (2017)
 Ur en enda strupe kommer sanningen om alla (2017)
 Tolv månader (2018)
 Bubbelgum EP (2019)
 2020 EP (2020)
 Dagsländor (2020) compilation album

Non-solo Albums 
 Negativa Apor (1999) together De 6 apornas armé
 Players & Pimpar (2001) demo songs with Ebloa
 Kamphundar (2004) Album in collaboration with Kamphundar
 Pyramid (2016) Patrull album

EPs 
 Världens Snabbaste EP (2006) EP with OB-1, released on Fronda's website
 Alla är komiker (2015) Patrull EP
 Chicago (2015) Patrull EP

References

External links
Official website

1981 births
Living people
People from Västerås
Swedish rappers
Melodifestivalen contestants of 2008